STI College (formerly known as Systems Technology Institute) is a for-profit college network in the Philippines. They primarily cater to computer science and information technology education, but also offer other courses, such as business management and accountancy. The acronym STI has been declared as an orphan initialism after their name change in 2006.

STI uses a trimester calendar as opposed to the typical semester collegiate education program mostly used by Philippine universities.

Ownership 

STI College is wholly owned by the STI Education Services Group, Inc. (STI ESG), a subsidiary of the STI Education Systems Holdings, Inc. of Dr. Eusebio "Yosi" H. Tanco, PhD.

The STI Education Systems Holdings, Inc. is the holding company within the Tanco Group that drives investment in its education business. STI Education Systems Holdings, Inc. has 5 subsidiaries, namely: STI Education Services Group, Inc. (“STI ESG”), STI West Negros University, Inc. (“STI WNU”), Information and Communications Technology Academy, Inc. (“iACADEMY”), Attenborough Holdings Corporation (“AHC”) and Neschester Corporation (“Neschester”).

Eusebio Tanco also serves as the majority and principal owner of Maestro Holdings, Inc., formerly known as STI Investments, Inc., another company part of the Tanco Group.

History
STI was a former computer center organized in 1983, when entrepreneurs Augusto C. Lagman, Herman T. Gamboa, Benjamin A. Santos and Edgar H. Sarte set up the Systems Technology Institute to train people in programming and IT. At first there were two schools, and then it grew to more than 70. The school was then purchased by Eusebio H. Tanco.

In 2006, the acronym of STI no longer stands as Systems Technology Institute as it offers not just only Technology and Science courses, but also  Health, Arts, Management, Businesses, Hospitality, and Culinary, albeit up to the present time though, IT and CS courses are still the largest population in the institution. The initials STI therefore has been orphaned and becomes a pseudo-acronym.

In 2002, STI obtained a majority share in De los Santos College to create the De Los Santos – STI College of Health Professions. In 2006, STI also acquired a stake in the De Los Santos Medical Center, and was renamed to De Los Santos – STI Medical Center. The De Los Santos – STI College was later closed down and the De Los Santos – STI Medical Center reverted to their old name De Los Santos Medical Center when it was taken over by the Metro Pacific Hospital Holdings, Inc.

In October 2013, STI Health Professionals, Inc., a subsidiary of STI ESG and operator of De Los Santos – STI College, purchased Makati Medical Center College from Medical Doctors, Inc. through its sister school PWU. PWU was in a joint venture arrangement with STI at the time. That arrangement has since ended and PWU has sold Makati Medical Center College (now Medici Di Makati College). In 2019, the STI Education Services Group acquired maritime school STI NAMEI.

STI College programs include information and communications technology, engineering, health care, accountancy, business & management, hospitality (National Competition) and tourism management (Amadeus Software System).

Other branches and campuses 

Some of STI's campuses nationwide uses various STI trade names. Student population mainly determine the longevity of the campuses. STI Education Systems Holdings also owns and operates one non-STI branded college and manages one acquired university.

Other higher education institutions owned by STI
 iAcademy
 STI West Negros University (STI WNU)
 STI Paranaque city
 STI S.J.D.M.

See also
List of universities and colleges in the Philippines
 Academia Education Systems Holdings, Inc. (stylized as academia) registered on the Philippine Stock Exchange

Other higher education institutions in the Philippines of similar type:
AMA Computer University
Asian Institute of Computer Studies
Informatics Philippines

References

External links

Companies listed on the Philippine Stock Exchange
1983 establishments in the Philippines
Educational institutions established in 1983
Universities and colleges in Manila